Dorota Tlałka-Mogore (born 27 April 1963 in Zakopane) is a Polish and later French former alpine skier who competed in the 1984 Winter Olympics and 1988 Winter Olympics. She is the twin sister of fellow alpine skier Małgorzata Tlałka-Mogore.

The twins were born into a winter sports family: their father, Jan, was a 16-time Polish speed skating champion, whilst their mother Wlada was a cross-country skier. They both skied and skated during their childhood before they focused on skiing from the age of 12. Dorota took a fourth place in the slalom at the 1982 Alpine Skiing World Championships. In 1985 the twins decided to leave Poland as they were unhappy with the training opportunities in the country. They originally intended to study and train in France and continue to compete for Poland, however in October 1985 Dorota and Małgorzata married French brothers Christian and Christophe Mogore (the former a sports journalist, the latter a former racing cyclist) and the pair became French citizens in June 1986.

References

External links
 

1963 births
Living people
Polish female alpine skiers
French female alpine skiers
Olympic alpine skiers of Poland
Olympic alpine skiers of France
Alpine skiers at the 1984 Winter Olympics
Alpine skiers at the 1988 Winter Olympics
Universiade medalists in alpine skiing
Sportspeople from Zakopane
Polish emigrants to France
Naturalized citizens of France
Universiade silver medalists for Poland
Competitors at the 1985 Winter Universiade